Aldin Čajić (born 11 September 1992) is a Bosnian professional footballer who plays as a midfielder.

Čajić started his professional career at Teplice, before joining Dukla Prague in 2014. Three years later, he moved to Elazığspor. Later that year, he signed with İstanbulspor.

Club career

Early career
Čajić came through Sparta Prague's youth academy, which he joined in 2007 from a local club.

In July 2010, he moved to Teplice. He made his professional debut against Brno on 12 September at the age of 18. On 2 May 2011, he scored his first professional goal.

In May 2014, Čajić joined Dukla Prague.

In January 2017, he was transferred to Turkish side Elazığspor. On 14 May, he scored his first career hat-trick against Balıkesirspor.

In July 2017, Čajić signed with İstanbulspor. He helped İstanbulspor achieve promotion in the 2021-22 season for the first time in 17 years. He started in İstanbulspor return to the Süper Lig in a in a 2–0 season opening loss to Trabzonspor on 5 August 2022.

International career
Čajić represented Bosnia and Herzegovina on various youth levels.

Career statistics

Club

References

External links

1992 births
Living people
People from Konjic
Bosniaks of Bosnia and Herzegovina
Bosnia and Herzegovina Muslims
Bosnia and Herzegovina footballers
Bosnia and Herzegovina youth international footballers
Bosnia and Herzegovina under-21 international footballers
Bosnia and Herzegovina expatriate footballers
Association football midfielders
FK Teplice players
FK Dukla Prague players
Elazığspor footballers
İstanbulspor footballers
Tuzlaspor players
Czech First League players
TFF First League players
Süper Lig players
Expatriate footballers in the Czech Republic
Expatriate footballers in Turkey
Bosnia and Herzegovina expatriate sportspeople in the Czech Republic
Bosnia and Herzegovina expatriate sportspeople in Turkey